Akram Bounabi (born 28 August 1999) is an Algerian fencer. He competed in the 2020 Summer Olympics in the Men's Sabre Individual event. He finished in 35th place after losing to Kaito Streets of Japan in the Round of 64.

References

1999 births
Living people
Fencers at the 2020 Summer Olympics
Algerian male sabre fencers
Olympic fencers of Algeria
21st-century Algerian people
Competitors at the 2022 Mediterranean Games
Mediterranean Games competitors for Algeria